Central Parkway is a bus rapid transit station on the Mississauga Transitway in central Mississauga, Ontario, Canada. It is located on the east side of Central Parkway East along the south side of Highway 403. The street suffix "Parkway" was added to the station name so commuters didn't assume it was the central station in the system, which is located one stop west at the City Centre.

The first four stations on the Transitway at Central Parkway, Cawthra, Tomken and Dixie, opened on November 17, 2014.

References

External links

Mississauga Transitway
2014 establishments in Ontario